The Nagpuria people, also Nagpuri or Sadan, are an Indo-Aryan speaking ethnolinguistic group who are the native speakers of the Nagpuri language and natives of the western Chota Nagpur Plateau region of Indian states of  Jharkhand, Bihar, Chhattisgarh and Odisha.

Names
The native speakers of the Sadani/Nagpuri language are known as Sadan. In the Nagpuri language, Sadan means settled people or  those people who live in houses. In Nagpuri, the house pigeon is called Sad perwa and the forest pigeon is called Ban perwa. Similarly, Sadan people are the people who live in houses as opposed to living in the forest.  The word Sadan was used on the estate of Nagvanshi, king of Chotanagpur. During the British Period, local hindus were referred to as Sudh or Sudhan in Chotanagpur. The concept of Sadan emerged during the reign of Nagvanshis.

The speakers of the Khortha, Panchpargania and Kurmali languages are also known as Sadan. According to Peter Shanti Naurangi (1956), the word Sadan probably  derives from Nishada, referring to an ethnic group of North India. According to Bisheshwar Prasad Keshari, the original form of these languages must have developed in different Nagjati.

In literary tradition, the language is known as Nagpuri. The speakers of the Nagpuri language are locally known as Nagpuria or Nagpuria samaj. They are also known as Nagpuri or Napuri samaj. The Nagpuri community is a heterogeneous group with an amalgamation of various castes with diverse occupations, origins, history, customs and values who share common language, music tradition, oral and written literature.

History 

It is assumed that the Sadan people first brought the Indo-Aryan languages to the Chotanagpur plateau. There is not any fixed date of arrival of Sadan in Chota Nagpur. Probably, Sadan arrived in Chota Nagpur sometime after Aryan came to South Asia. According to the Anthropologist, Sadans are of Aryan origin and their culture, such as festivals and cuisine, are similar to tribal people due to residing with the tribals. According to scholars, small numbers of Austro-Asiatic language speakers adopted Indo-Aryan languages and culture.

Proto historic era 
Stone tools and microliths were discovered from the Chota Nagpur plateau region, which are from the Mesolithic period. Flake tools, arrowheads, celts have been found which are from the Neolithic period. During the 2nd millennium BC, the use of Cooper tools had spread in the Chotanagpur plateau region and these find-complexes known as Copper Hoard culture associated with Ochre Coloured Pottery culture. According to many historians, the Copper hoard people were early Indo-Aryan speakers, who came to South Asia earlier than Vedic Aryan and spread farther to the East. According to the Jharkhand Co-ordination committee (1989), Sadan people are the early Aryan people (Early Indo-Aryan language speakers) and differ from other Aryan people as Sadan strictly didn't follow Brahmincal practices.

Various copper hoard artifacts were discovered in Chotanagpur, such as copper ornaments, celts, axes, axe ingots, vessels, toys, anklets, bracelets, chains, magical figures of man and woman which are from the transition period from the Neolithic to the Chalcolithic period. Also, bronze artifacts such as cups, ear rings, anklets and bracelets were discovered. These things were discovered in places such as Namkum, Bero in  Ranchi. The copper axe ingots were discovered from Kamdara, Basia, now in Gumla district, Hami near Mahuadanr in Palamu district (Now Latehar) in 1915.
The use of iron tools, pottery spread in the region during  1400 to 800 BCE according to carbon dating of iron slag, sickle and wheel made pottery which was found in Barudih of Singhbhum district. The Iron celt was dated to 1200 BCE.

Ancient period 
During the 4th Century BCE, the region was ruled by the Nanda Empire.
In the Mauryan period, this region was ruled by a number of states, which were collectively known as the Atavika (forest) states. These states accepted the suzerainty of the Maurya empire during Ashoka's reign (c. 232 BCE). The ancient sites of Saridkel in present Khunti district exhibited  burnt brick houses, copper hooks, rods, Kushan copper coins, gold earrings, iron arrow heads, ploughshares etc.  This suggests Kushan influence in the region. The Brahmi inscription is also found in Saridkel which is from 3rd century BCE. Excavation at sites Kunjala exhibited redware pottery with coarse fabrics.  Excavation at Urn burial site of Khuntitola exhibited redware pottery with coarse fabrics, copper and iron tools.

Medieval period
During the medieval period, Nagvanshi and Ramgarh Raj ruled in the region. Nagvanshi king Gajghat Rai built Mahamaya temple  in Vikram samvat 965 (908 CE) in Hapamuni village in Gumla district. During the 12th century, Nagvanshi king Bhim Karn shifted his capital to Khukhragarh after defeating Raksel of Surguja when they invaded the region. Then Bhim Karn captured territory as far as Surguja and Palamu.

The Brahmanda Purana (c.400 CE - c.1000 CE) mention Nagvanshi as Naga king of Sankha dwip. It gives descriptions of five dwips i.e. land. It includes the Sankha dwip where the Sankh river flows from the hill near the kingdom of the Naga King (Nagvanshi), where precious stones are found.

Modern period 
In 1585, during the reign of the Nagvanshi king Madhu Karn, the Mughals invaded Khukhragarh, then the Nagvanshi ruler became vassal of Mughals. Durjan Shah built Navratangarh after release from Mughal captivity. His successor Ram Shah built Kapilnath Temple in 1643. Raghunath Shah built several temples during his reign. He is the first known poet of the Nagpuri language.

The King of Barkagarh, Thakur Ani Nath Shahdeo, built Jagannath temple in 1691. Nagvanshis were independent during weak Mughal rule. Maninath Shah (1748-1762) consolidated his authority in Chotanagpur by conquering the neighbouring small kingdoms of Bundu, Silli, Barwe, Rahe, Tamar.

After the Battle of Buxar, the East India Company got rights to collect taxes from Bihar and Bengal territory. Due to conflict with the tribes of Singhbhum and Ramgarh Raj, Dripnath Shah became tributary to the East India Company. Due to tax impositions by the British East India Company, various rebellions occurred. During the reign of Govind Nath Shah, a rebellion occurred in Nawagarh led by Jagirdar Baidhnath Shah. Later, Bakhtar Say and Mundal Singh, two landowners from Gumla, joined the rebelion and fought against the British East India Company in 1812 against tax impositions on farmers. The British hanged them in Kolkata. Between 1831 and 1833, during the reign of Jagannath Shah Deo, the Kol uprising occurred due to the disposition of some Mankis in Sonepur Pargana and tribal Munda and Ho insurgents resorted in plundering and burning of houses of Sikh and Thikedars as well as villages of Sadans. This insurgency was suppressed by Thomas Wilkinson.

In 1854, the South West Frontier under the East India Company was renamed as Chota Nagpur Division. In the 1857 rebellion, Thakur Vishwanath Shahdeo and Pandey Ganpat Rai led rebels against the British East India Company. Tikait Umrao Singh,  Sheikh Bhikhari,  Nadir Ali, Jai Mangal Singh played pivotal role in Indian Rebellion of 1857.
After the Indian Rebellion of 1857, United Kingdom directly ruled the territory ruled by the British East India Company. In 1912, Chota Nagpur Division became part of Bihar and Orissa Province. In 1936, Orissa Province separated from the Bihar and Orissa Province on a linguistic basis and the remaining area became Bihar Province.

Post Independence
In 1947, India became independent from British rule. The Bihar Province became Bihar state. There was a demand by the Christian tribals to create a separate state since the separation of Orissa Province. In the early period of demand, discussion against Dikku (non-tribals) was a common theme of meetings. The discrimination against non-tribals in the name of tribal unity led to distrust between tribals and Sadans. Most writers of movements put too much emphasis on tribal aspects of Jharkhand, which led to the tribal-Sadan divide. The Jharkhand Party, led by Jaipal Singh Munda, submitted a memoir to the State reorganization commission in 1955 to form a separate state for tribes in south Bihar, but it got rejected due to lack of the common language in the region, tribes being in the minority, the hindi was the predominant language of the region and adverse effect on economy of Bihar. Later, in the demand for a separate Jharkhand state, regional languages and culture were given emphasis. Later, Sadan politicians, lawyers, writers as well as other non-tribals were also involved in creating a separate state, such as Lal Ranvijay Nath Shahdeo, Binod Bihari Mahato, Bisheshwar Prasad Keshari, Bhuneshwar Anuj, Lal Pingley Nath Shahdeo . The Jharkhand coordination committee (JCC), consisting of Ram Dayal Munda, B. P. Keshri, Binod Bihari Mahato, Santosh Rana and Suraj Singh Besra formed and sent a memoir to form the separate Jharkhand state to the central government in 1989. The Centre government recommended forming Jharkhand Autonomous Council in 1989. In 1988, the BJP also wanted to create the Vanachal state in the region and promised to create a separate state in the election of 1998. Then, after winning the election in the region, it decided to form a new state.

In November 2000, the new states of Chhattisgarh and Jharkhand separated from Madhya Pradesh and Bihar, respectively.
According to the President of the Sadan organization, Mulvasi Sadan Morcha Rajendra Prasad, Sadan people have no reservations, so they are marginalized in their own state and the government of Jharkhand has decepted Sadan.

Communities 
Various Sadan communities or Jati in Chota Nagpur Plateau  speak the Nagpuri language, including the Ahir, Bhuiya, Binjhia, Bhogta, Brahmin, Chik Baraik, Dom, Ghasi, Jhora/Kewat,  Kudmi/Kurmi, Kumhar, Lohra/Lohar, Mahli, Nagvanshi, Rautia, Sonar, Teli and Turi among others.

According to scholars, Chik Baraik are considered the early Indo-Aryan language speaking settlers. The Brahmins, who are also considered Sadan, migrated into the region during the reign of Nagvanshi and were employed as priests. According to the Nagvanshavali, Sakaldwipiya Brahmins were the priests of Nagvanshi. According to them, they have been staying in the region for a long time. According to the scholars, Brahmins migrated into the Greater Magadha region after the later Vedic Period.<ref name="Bronkorst">Bronkorst, J; Greater Magadha: Studies in the Culture of Early India (2007), p. 3</ref>

All communities in Chotanagpur are known as Jati, whether caste or tribe. The words, caste and tribe were started to use during British rule. The British enlisted Caste and tribe and enacted laws related to tribe and caste, such as the law of inheritance and land transfer. While some Sadan communities were listed as caste, some were as tribe. In 1936, many Sadan communities such as Bhogta, Bhuiya, Chik Baraik, Ghasi, Lohar, Mahli, Turi were included in the backward tribe list in Chota Nagpur Division of Bihar Province. Later, some were delisted from the tribe list while some remained on the Scheduled Tribe list. Still, while some Sadan communities are on the list of Other Backward Class and Scheduled Caste, some caste such as Chik Baraik (Weaver), Lohra (Blacksmith) and Mahli (Bamboo workers) are listed as a Scheduled Tribe.

Lineages
There are several lineages found among Nagpuri  speaking social groups. Marriage occurs between different lineages and is forbidden within the same lineage. Some lineages among some nagpuri speaking social groups such as Chik Baraik, Ghasi, Lohra, Rautia are Baghel (tiger), Barha (boar), Bira (hawk), Dhan (rice), Hathi (elephant), Induar (eel), Kachhua (turtle), Kansi (Kans grass), Nag (cobra), Sand (bull), Sona (gold).

The other word used for lineage is Gotra, which was a word initially used by the Brahmins. It was later adopted by other communities. Nagvanshi have Kashyap gotra. Kashyap gotra was adopted by many people during the 1st millennium CE as it was bestowed upon followers of non-vedic tradition and who had forgotten their gotra.

 Culture 

Nagpuri culture includes literature, festivals, folk song and dance.

Language and literature

Sadan people traditionally speak the Nagpuri language, also known as Sadani or Sadri. It is officially known as Nagpuri language in Jharkhand. The Nagpuri language is primarily spoken in the western and central Chota Nagpur plateau region. In addition to Sadan, it is also used as a link language between many tribal groups in the region. Nagpuri belongs to the Bihari group of Indo-Aryan languages.  The evidence of writing in Nagpuri is found from the 17th century. The Nagvanshi king Raghunath Shah and the King of Ramgarh, Dalel Singh, were poets.  Hanuman Singh, Jaigovind Mishra, Barju Ram Pathak, Ghasi Ram Mahli and Das Mahli were prominent poets. Some prominent writers of the modern period are Praful Kumar Rai, Lal Ranvijay Nath Shahdeo, Bisheshwar Prasad Keshari,   Sahani Upendra Pal Singh, Bhuneshwar Anuj, Girdhari Ram Gonjhu and Shakuntala Mishra.

Festivals
Some traditional festivals of Sadan are Ashadhi Puja, Karam, Teej, Jitiya, Nawakhani, Sohrai/Diwali,  Surjahi Puja, Makar Sankranti, Fagua, Bad Pahari and Sarhul. Some  festivals which were later adopted are Navratri and Chhath. The Navratri festival was adopted by Nagvanshis in the 18th century. Before that, Nagvanshi were followers of the Shaivism tradition. Chhath is also not a traditional festival of Sadan but adopted later by some.

Folk music and dance
Paiki is a martial folk dance performed at weddings and functions. The musical instruments used in folk music and dance include dhol, mandar, bansi, nagara, dhak, shehnai, khartal and Narsinga.

Theth Nagpuri is a genre of typical Nagpuri music which is based on traditional ragas of folk songs such as 
Jhumar, Pawas, Udasi and Fagua. It is connected to Nagpuri tradition.

Clothes
Traditional clothes of Sadan are Dhoti, Sari, Kurta and Chadar. But in modern times, shirts, pants, coats are also used. The traditional Lal paad clothes  have ritual value in marriage ceremonies. People wear them at traditional festivals and functions.

Marriage tradition
Some wedding rituals of the Nagpuri speaking social groups such as Chik Baraik are madwa, baraat, parghani, sindoordan, bidai etc. There are different songs for different wedding rituals. Domkach folk dance is performed during the weddings of Sadan. The musical instruments used in nagpuri wedding are nagara, dhak and  shehnai.

Religion
Sadan observes festivals such as Ashadhi, Nawakhani, Sohrai, Surjahi Puja, Fagun and Bad Pahari. These festivals invlove fasting and offering sacrifices. The sun and ancestors are venerated in most festivals. Sacrifice is offered to Gaurea at the Sohrai festival. The head of the family propitates these deities. 
At the village festivals such as Karam, Sarhul, the rituals are performed by the village priest Pahan and his assistant Pujar''.

According to scholars, the local deities which are not found in hindu scriptures are deities of folk tradition, which is a non-vedic tradition. It is a pre-vedic tradition extending back to prehistoric times, or before the writing of the Vedas. According to Brahmincal literature, the region of Magadha was outside the pale of the Vedic religion i.e people were not following Vedic religion in the Magadha region. The influence of Vedic religion/Brahmanism reached in the Chotanagpur region during the reign of Nagvanshi and Nagvanshi kings constructed several temples during their reign and invited Brahmin from different parts of the country for priestly duty. Some temple constructed by Nagvanshi kings including 17th century Kapilnath Temple in Navratangarh and Jagannath Temple of Ranchi.  But rituals in home and village carried out by head of family and village priest Pahan respectively.

In 1989, the Jharkhand Co-ordination committee (JCC), who was instrumental in the demand for a separate Jharkhand state in front of the central government, also stated in their paper that Sadan may be the earliest Aryan population and could be the subcategoriable as Naga people as they differ from other Aryan group and did't strictly follow Brahmanical religion.

Traditional administrative System
In Chotoanagpur, there was a traditional administrative system for governing villages known as Parha. In the Parha system, there were the posts of Mahto (village chief), Pahan (village priest), Pujar (assistant of Pahan) or Pani Bharwa (water bearer), Bhandari (treasurer), Chowkidar (watchman), Diwan (minister) and Raja (king). During the reign of Nagvanshi, the owners of land were known as Bhuinhar. Bhuinhar refers to the first people who cleared forest, built farmland and houses in a village. Sadans were in the posts of Diwan, Thakur, Pandey, Karta (executive), Lal, Mahato, Pahan and Raja.

Notable people 
Bhuneshwar Anuj, Journalist and Scholar
Bulu Chik Baraik, Politician
Girdhari Ram Gonjhu, Litterateur and Scholar
Govind Sharan Lohra, folk singer
Ghasi Ram Mahli, Poet
Shakuntala Mishra, professor and writer
Mahavir Nayak, folk singer
Mukund Nayak, folk artist
Nandlal Nayak, Music composer
Nikki Pradhan, hockey player
Praful Kumar Rai, writer and singer
Bakhtar Say, freedom fighter
Raghunath Shah, Nagvanshi king and poet
Ani Nath Shahdeo, King of Barkagarh
Gopal Sharan Nath Shahdeo, Prince and former M.L.A from Hatia
Jagannath Shah Deo, Nagvanshi king in 19th century
Lal Chintamani Sharan Nath Shahdeo, Last Nagvanshi king and politician
Lal Pingley Nath Shahdeo, Jurist and Political activist
Lal Ranvijay Nath Shahdeo, Lawyer, writer, poet and political activist
Udai Pratap Nath Shah Deo, Nagvanshi king
Vishwanath Shahdeo, Freedom fighter in 1857 rebellion
Mundal Singh, freedom fighter
Sahani Upendra Pal Singh, writer

References

External links

Indo-Aryan peoples
Nagpuria people
Ethnic groups in India
Ethnic groups in Jharkhand
Ethnic groups in South Asia